REDF may refer to
Rediff.com, an Indian news, information, entertainment and shopping web portal
Roberts Enterprise Development Fund, a philanthropic organisation founded by George R. Roberts